Shatrughna is a prince of Ayodhya, King of Madhupura and Vidisha, and a brother of Prince Rama in the Hindu epic Ramayana. He is also known as Ripudaman (vanquisher of foes). He is the twin of Lakshmana. He is a loyalist of Bharata, just like Lakshmana is to Rama. According to the Valmiki Ramayana, Shatrughna is the re incarnarnation of Sudarshana Chakra (Rama). Shatrughna also appears as the 412th name of Vishnu in the Vishnu Sahasranama of the Mahabharata.
 
According to Ramayana, Rama is the seventh avatar of Vishnu, while Lakshmana, Shatrughna and Bharata are the avatars of Sheshanaga, Panchajanya, and the Sudarshana Chakra respectively.

Birth and family

Shatrughna was born to the king of Ayodhya, Dasharatha, and his third wife, Queen Sumitra, a princess of Kashi. Dasharatha's other two wives, Kaushalya and Kaikeyi, bore children who would be his half-brothers. Kaushalya had Rama and Kaikeyi had Bharata, who were Shatrughna's half-brothers. Shatrughna's twin brother was Lakshmana. Shatrughna was married to Shrutakirti, daughter of Kushadhwaja, Janaka's younger brother. Thus, Shrutakirti was Sita's cousin. They had two sons - Subahu and Shatrughati.

Rama's exile

When Rama was exiled, Shatrughna dragged Kaikeyi's old nurse Manthara (who was responsible for poisoning the queen's mind against Rama) and tried to kill her, but he was restrained by Bharata, who felt that Rama would not approve.

Bharata went to Rama and asked him to come back to Ayodhya, but Rama refused. Bharata ruled Ayodhya from Nandigram and was an excellent leader, acting as the very embodiment of dharma. Although Bharata was the king designate of Ayodhya during Rama's exile, it was Shatrughna who undertook of the administration of the whole kingdom during Rama's absence. Shatrughna was the only solace for the three queen mothers during the absence of Rama, Lakshmana, and Bharata from Ayodhya.

Rage against Manthara

Manthara appears only once in the Ramayana after Rama's banishment. Having been rewarded by Kaikeyi with costly clothing and jewels, she was walking in the palace gardens when Bharata and his half-brother Shatrughna came upon her. Seeing her, Shatrughna flew into a violent rage over Rama's banishment decided to attack her. Kaikeyi begged Bharata to save her, which he did, telling Shatrughna that it would be a sin to kill a woman, and that Rama would be furious with them both if he did such a thing. He relented and the brothers left, while Kaikeyi attempted to comfort Manthara.

The Slaying of Lavanasura

Although he played a relatively minor role in the Ramayana, Shatrughna was important to the main story and goal of the epic. His chief exploit was the killing of Lavanasura, the demon King of Madhupura (Mathura), who was a nephew of Ravana, the King of Lanka, slain by Rama.

Lavanasura was the son of Madhu, the pious demon-king after whom the city of Madhupura was named. Madhu's wife and Lavanusara's mother Kumbhini was a sister of Ravana. Lavanasura was holder of the divine Trishula (Trident) of Lord Shiva, and nobody was able to kill him or prevent him from committing sinful activities.

Shatrughna begged Rama and his elder brothers to allow him the opportunity to serve them by killing Lavanasura. Shatrughna killed the demon with an arrow imbibed with the power of Vishnu. After Lavanasura's death, Rama crowned him King of Madhupura.

Retirement

After Rama, the seventh Avatar of Vishnu completed 11,000 years of perfectly pious rule upon earth, Shatrughna had divided his kingdom consisting of Madhupura and Vidisha between his sons Subahu and Shatrughati; and walked into the river Sarayu to return to his true and eternal Mahavishnu form. Bharata and Shatrughna followed him into the river and merged into Mahavishnu.

Temples

 Shatrughna Temple at Payammal in Thrissur District of Kerala
 Shatrughna Temple at Muni Ki Reti, Rishikesh
 Shatrughna Temple near Kans-tila, Mathura, UP

References

External links
 Satrughna and Mathura in the Uttarakanda
 Shatrughna Temple at Muni Ke Reti, Rishikesh

Solar dynasty
Characters in the Ramayana